Abolfadl Harawi was a 10th-century astronomer who, along with al-Khujandi, studied under the patronage of the Buyid dynasty in Rey, Persia. The nisba "Harawi" suggests that he was originally from Herat, in ancient times also known als "Haraiva". 

See also
 List of Iranian scientists

People from Ray, Iran
Year of birth unknown
Year of death unknown
10th-century Iranian astronomers
Astronomers of the medieval Islamic world
Scholars under the Buyid dynasty